Notestein is a surname. Notable people with the surname include:

Barbara Notestein (born 1949), American social worker and politician
Frank W. Notestein (1902–1983), American demographer 
Wallace Notestein (1878–1969), American historian